Kacper Śpiewak (born 30 May 2000) is a Polish footballer who plays as a forward for Polish side Bruk-Bet Termalica Nieciecza and the Poland national under-21 team. Śpiewak began his senior club career playing for Stal Stalowa Wola, before signing with Nieciecza in 2020, winning the promotion to the Ekstraklasa in his first season.

Club career

Stal Stalowa Wola

Śpiewak started his career with Stal Stalowa Wola.

On 30 July 2017, he made his professional debut for Stal, in a II liga 1–1 draw to Gryf Wejherowo. In his third season at Stal, he scored his premier goal, as his team drew 2–2 to Olimpia Elbląg. At the end of that campaign, Stal was relegated to III liga. In the 2020–21 season, he played two games, scoring one goal in a Polish Cup fixture against Skra Częstochowa.

Bruk-Bet Termalica Nieciecza
On 19 August 2020, Stal Stalowa Wola announced that I liga side Bruk-Bet Termalica Nieciecza activated Śpiewak's buyout clause. On 23 August 2020, he made his debut and scored a goal for Bruk-Bet in a 4–0 Polish Cup victory over Bytovia Bytów. On 23 August 2021, he made his debut in Ekstraklasa, entering the pitch in the 85th minute in a 1–1 draw against Stal Mielec.

International career
Śpiewak began his international career with Poland U21 in 2021. He made his first junior appearance in a 4–0 2023 UEFA European Under-21 Championship qualification's win over Germany U21 on 12 November 2021, coming on as a substitute for Adrian Benedyczak. On 16 November 2021, he scored two goals for Poland, in a 5–0 qualifying victory over Latvia U21.

Career statistics

References

External links
 

2000 births
Living people
People from Stalowa Wola
Polish footballers
Poland under-21 international footballers
Association football forwards
Stal Stalowa Wola players
Bruk-Bet Termalica Nieciecza players
Ekstraklasa players
I liga players
II liga players
III liga players